"Sweet Pea" is a song written and performed by Tommy Roe.  The song was produced by Gary S. Paxton.
It was featured on his 1966 album, Sweet Pea.

Chart performance
It reached number 1 in Canada, number 1 in New Zealand, number 7 in Australia, and number 8 on the Billboard Hot 100 in 1966. 
The song was ranked number 44 on Billboard magazine's Top Hot 100 songs of 1966.

Other versions
The Ventures released an instrumental version on their 1966 album, Wild Things!<ref>[http://www.discogs.com/Ventures-Wild-Things/release/1171701 The Ventures, Wild Things!] Discogs.com, Retrieved May 29, 2015</ref>
Roger Williams released a version as the B-side to his single "Love Me Forever" in April 1967.
Friar Tuck released a version as the B-side to his single "Alley-Oop" in May 1967.
Manfred Mann released a version as a single in May 1967 that reached number 36 in the United Kingdom.
Donald Lautrec released a version as a single in 1967.
Gang Starr sampled Roe's version on their 1989 song "Movin' On" from the album No More Mr. Nice Guy.
Big Audio Dynamite's song "Rush" samples the drum break from Roe's "Sweet Pea".
The 2007 re-release of Cub's 1993 album Betti-Cola featured a cover of the song.

In media
Samantha Morton performs a frenetic dance to the tune in the 1999 film Jesus' Son.
The song is also played in the background in two episodes of the Hulu drama mini series, The Girl from Plainville (2022).''

References

1966 songs
1966 singles
1967 singles
Songs written by Tommy Roe
Tommy Roe songs
The Ventures songs
Manfred Mann songs
RPM Top Singles number-one singles
Number-one singles in New Zealand
ABC Records singles
Fontana Records singles